The 1961–62 season was the 54th year of football played by Dundee United, and covers the period from 1 July 1961 to 30 June 1962. United finished in tenth place in the First Division.

Match results
Dundee United played a total of 41 competitive matches during the 1961–62 season.

Legend

All results are written with Dundee United's score first.
Own goals in italics

First Division

Scottish Cup

League Cup

See also
 1961–62 in Scottish football

References

Dundee United F.C. seasons
Dundee United